A flame arrester (also spelled arrestor), deflagration arrester,
or flame trap
are safety devices fitted to openings of enclosures or to pipe work, and are intended to allow flow but prevent flame transmission fuel combustion by extinguishing the flame.

Usage and applications 
The uses of a flame arrester include:
Stopping the spread of an open fire
Limiting the spread of an already occurred explosion
Preventing potentially explosive mixtures from igniting
Confining fire within a controlled location
Stopping the propagation of a flame traveling at subsonic velocities

Some common objects that have flame arresters are:
 Fuel storage tank vents
 Fuel gas pipelines
 Safety storage cabinets for paint, aerosol cans, and other flammable mixtures
 The exhaust system of internal combustion engines
 The air intake of marine inboard engines
 Davy lamps in coal mining
 Overproof rum and other flammable liquors.
 Portable plastic gasoline containers

Principles
Flame arresters are safety devices fitted to openings of enclosures or to pipe work, and are intended to allow flow but prevent flame transmission. A flame arrester functions by absorbing the heat from a flame front thus dropping the burning gas/air mixture below its auto-ignition temperature; consequently, the flame cannot survive. The heat is absorbed through channels (passages) designed into an element. These channels are chosen and measured as the MESG (maximum experimental safe gap) of the gas for a particular installation. These passages can be regular, like crimped metal ribbon or wire mesh or a sheet metal plate with punched holes, or irregular, such as those in random packing.

The required size of the channels needed to stop the flame front can vary significantly, depending on the flammability of the fuel mixture. The large openings on a chain link fence are capable of slowing the spread of a small, slow-burning grass fire, but fast-burning grass fires will penetrate the fence unless the holes are very small. In a coal mine containing highly explosive coal dust or methane, the wire mesh of a Davy lamp must be very tightly spaced.

For flame arresters used as a safety device, the mesh must be protected from damage due to being dropped or struck by another object, and the mesh must be capable of rigidly retaining its shape during the propagation of a flame front. Any shifting of the individual wires that make up the mesh can create an opening large enough to allow the flame to penetrate and spread beyond the barrier.

On a fuel storage vent, flame arresters also serve a secondary purpose of allowing air pressure to equalize inside the tank when fuel is added or removed, while also preventing insects from flying or crawling into the vent piping and fouling the fuel in the tanks and pipes.

Safety
Flame arresters should be used only in the gas group and conditions they have been designed and tested for. Since the depth on an arrester is specified for certain conditions, changes in the temperature, pressure, or composition of the gases entering the arrester can cause the flame spatial velocity to increase, making the design of the arrester insufficient to stop the flame front ("propagation"). The deflagration may continue downstream of the arrester.

Flame arresters should be periodically inspected to make sure they are free of dirt, insects using it as a nest, or corrosion. The U.S. Chemical Safety and Hazard Investigation Board concluded that an uninspected and badly corroded flame arrester failed to prevent a 2006 explosion at a wastewater treatment plant in Daytona Beach, Florida.

References

See also

 Flashback arrestor
 Detonation arrester
 Spark arrestor

Industrial safety devices
Fire prevention
Chemical safety
Safety engineering
Occupational safety and health